The voiced labiodental approximant is a type of consonantal sound, used in some spoken languages. With an advanced diacritic, this letter also indicates a bilabial approximant, though the diacritic is frequently omitted because no contrast is likely.

As the voiceless  is also realized as an approximant, it is also an example of a language contrasting voiceless and voiced labiodental approximants.

Features
Features of the voiced labiodental approximant:

Occurrence

See also
 List of phonetics topics
 R-labialization
 Rhotacism (speech impediment): pronouncing  as

References

Bibliography

External links
 

Pulmonic consonants
Oral consonants